The 2008 Norwegian Figure Skating Championships was held in Tønsberg from January 11 to 13, 2008. Skaters competed in the discipline of single skating. The results were used to choose the teams to the 2008 World Championships, the 2008 European Championships, the 2008 Nordic Championships, and the 2008 World Junior Championships.

Senior results

Ladies

External links
 results
 

Norwegian Figure Skating Championships
Norwegian Figure Skating Championships, 2008
2008 in Norwegian sport